Andrea Massa is an Italian electronics engineer, researcher and a full professor at University of Trento. He was named an IEEE Fellow by the IEEE Antennas & Propagation Society in 2018.

He is an editorial board member for the Journal of Electromagnetic Waves and Applications and a past editorial board member for the International Journal of Microwave and Wireless Technologies. He is a past associate editor of IEEE Transactions on Antennas and Propagation.

References

External links
 

Living people
Italian electrical engineers
Academic staff of the University of Trento
Fellow Members of the IEEE
21st-century Italian engineers
Year of birth missing (living people)